Ben(jamin) Webber may refer to:

Benjamin D. Webber, List of mayors of Beverly, Massachusetts
Ben Webber, character in There Should Have Been Castles
Ben Webber, musician in Lychway

See also
Ben Weber (disambiguation)